Alhaji Tanko Yakasai OFR (born 5 December 1925) is a Nigerian politician, human rights activist and former Liaison Officer to President Shehu Shagari. He is a founding member of Arewa Consultative Forum.

Personal life
Yakasai was born on 5 December 1925 in the northern Nigerian city of Kano, Yakasai Quarters Kano. He resides in Kano with his family. One of his children, Salihu Tanko Yakasai, was the social media aide of the governor of Kano State until he was arrested by Department of State Services at the end of February 2021.

Education
1933–1937:   Gidan Sarkin Gini quranic School, Yakasai
1937–1939:   Tsangayar Mallam Musa Dankore Quranic School, Hardawa, Bauchi
1939–1940:   Mallam Idi Quranic School, Tudun Jaba, Yakasai, Kano
1940–1942:   Alhaji Balarabe Kofar Mata Quranic and Islamic Studies School, Kano
1941–1946:   Shahuci Elementary School, evening classes, Kano City
1952–1955:   British Council English Tutorial classes, British Council, Kano
1956:        Ibadan University, College, Extramural Department Certificate Course on Comparative Federalism, Ibadan
1959:        Ibadan University College Extramural Department Certificate Course on Problem of Independence and Development, Ibadan
1963:        Wilhem Pieck Youths Higher Institute, Bogansee, German Democratic Republic, GDR

Work experience
1954–1960:  Hausa Editor, Daily Comet, Kano
1966–1967:  Sales Manager AGIP Nigeria Ltd, Kano Area Office

Public offices held
1967–1971:  Commissioner for Information Kano State
1971–1972:  Commissioner for Forestry, Community Development and Cooperatives, Kano State
1972–1975:  Commissioner for Finance, Kano State
1973–1975 & 2012-2015:  Member of Governing Council, Nigerian Institute of International Affairs
1979–1983:  Special Assistant to the President, Federal Republic of Nigeria on National Assembly Liaison

Traditional titles conferred
2013, Kauren Ganye conferred by Gangwari Ganye on the recommendation of Ganye Traditional Council, Adamawa State
2014, Odosiobodo of Ogbunike, conferred by Igwe John Umenyiora, Ezedioramma, Igwe of Ogbunike, Anambra State on the recommendation of Ogbunike Traditional Council

Political and civic positions held
1952–1955: National Secretary, NEPU Positive Action Wing (PAW)
1954–1960: National Publicity Secretary, Northern Elements Progressive Union, NEPU
1954–1956: National Chairman, NEPU Youth Association
1955–1958: National Secretary, Northern Elements progressive Union, NEPU
1959–1961: National Chairman NCNC/NEPU Youth Association
1961–1962: Secretary General, Sawaba Party of Nigeria
1961–1964: Deputy National Chairman, Nigerian Youth Congress, NYC
1963–1966: Deputy National Secretary, Northern Progressive Front
1966–1975: Founding member of Board of Governors, Kano Community Commercial College, KCCC
1970–1975: Founding member of Governing Council of Kano State Education Development Fund (KSEDF)
1969–1973: Chairman of Nigerian Chapter Afro-Asian Peoples Solidarity Organization (AAPSO)
1974–1976: National Chairman Nigeria-Soviet Friendship and Cultural Association (NSFCA)
1971–1975: Nigerian Representative on the Executive Committee World Peace Council
1978–1982: Deputy State Chairman, Kano and Member National Executive Committee, National Party of Nigeria (NPN)
1974/1975: Founder of Constitutional Conference Delegates Consultative Forum
1977/1978: National Coordinator Northern Patriotic Front
2003–Date: Founding member and member of Board of Trustees of Arewa Consultative Forum, ACF
2013/2015: National Chairman Nigeria National Summit Group
2014:      Member of National Conference Consensus Building Group

Conferences and meetings attended
1956: All-Northern Nigeria Political Parties Conference, which worked out modalities for a hitch free visit of Her Majesty Queen Elizabeth's official tour to Northern Nigeria during her state visit to Nigeria in 1956. The conference was convened by the Premier of Northern Nigeria, Sir Ahmadu Bello and was presided over by Sir Abubakar Tafawa Balewa The Prime Minister.
1958: All-Africa Peoples Conference, Accra, Ghana, where African Freedom Charter for the liberation of Africa from colonial rule was adopted
1960: All-Africa Positive Action Conference against French Atomic Test in the Sahara, Accra Ghana
1960: Led a six member first ever unofficial Nigerian delegation to the International Conference for solidarity with the struggles of the Algerian peoples for independence from the French Colonial Rule in Peking, People's Republic of China
1967: Delegate to the Northern Leaders of Thought Conference in Kaduna where Northern Nigeria's stand on the 1971 Nigeria's constitutional crises was adopted
1967: Member 16 member Northern Consultative Committee set up to advise the Military Governor of Northern Region
1967: Member Northern Nigeria Advisory Committee on the creation of states in Nigeria
1969: Leader Nigerian Delegation to the emergency meeting of Afro-Asian Peoples Solidarity Conference, Khartum, Republic of Sudan
1970: General Meeting of World Peace Council, Berlin, German Democratic Republic, GDR
1994/1995: Nigerian Constitutional Conference
2014: Delegate Nigerian National Conference
2014: Member National Conference Consensus Building Group

Awards and recognitions
1970: Life Patron Award by the Nigerian Union of Journalists Kano State Chapter
2005: National Honor Award of Officer of the Order of the Federal Republic, OFR
2007: National Television Authority (NTA) Prominence Award for Northern Development & Integration
2010: Kano State Government Achievers Award: Most Influential Personality of The Year
2013: Nigerian Institute of International Affairs Life Member Award
2014: National Conference Award of All Time Democrat
1962-1966: Due to passionate interest in promoting education in Nigeria, he used the opportunity to secure free scholarship for 12 Nigerians not related to him personally to undergo degree courses in various universities in the defunct Soviet Union. Following are the beneficiaries of the scholarships:
 Dr. Muhtari Ahmed Kura, Kano
 Dr. Muhammad Achimalo Garba, Kano
 Tanko Yaro Mahmud, Plateau
 Hamza Ahmed, Plateau
 Garba Dorayi, Kano
 Muhammad Nasir Ahmed, Sokoto
 Malam Sidi Kwaru, Kano
 Bello Sule, Kano
 Baba Jimeta, Adamawa
 Ado Gwadabe, Kano
 Nuhu Muhammed, Niger
 Alhaji Muhammad Abubakar Yakasai, Kano

Publications and extracurricular activities
2004/2012 Author: 1004-pages two volumes autobiography titled Tanko Yakasai: The Story of a Humble Life, an autobiography.
Delivered numerous lectures on various topics both at home and abroad on many national and international issues.
Public Affairs commentator for over six decades.
Visited more than 30 countries in Africa, Asia, Europe and America including United States of America, Russia, United Kingdom, France, Germany, Italy, Spain, Japan, India, People's Republic of China, South Korea, Philippines, Malaysia, Indonesia, Hong Kong, Burma, Taiwan, Thailand, Sri Lanka, Brazil, Egypt, United Arab Emirates, Qatar, Saudi Arabia, Syria, Lebanon, Kenya, Tanzania, Ethiopia, Ghana, Guinea, Mali, Togo, Republic of Niger among others.
Married with 19 children and 59 grandchildren.
Tanko Yakasai did not receive formal education; a self made person, he worked to acquire an education for himself.

Political persecution
Between 1953 and 1986, Tanko Yakasai was one of the most persecuted politicians in the history of Nigerian political activism, he was subjected to arrests and detentions on ten different occasions: four during colonial era, four in the First Republic, and two during military regime: one each under the (1983 to 1985) regime of General Muhammad Buhari and (1985 to 1993) regime of General Ibrahim Badamasi Babangida.

References

1925 births
Living people